Kenneth Choi Fung-Wah (born 28 November 1960) is a singer and actor from Hong Kong. He enrolled in a radio singing contest and won . He composed the music for the 1981 song, "Beautiful Silhouette" ("Sin Ying"), which won an award at the 1981 RTHK Top 10 Gold Songs Awards. Caron wrote the lyrics of the song.

At the 1985 Jade Solid Gold Best Ten Music Awards Presentation, when Leslie Cheung won three awards, Choi—who was one of the hosts of the awards show—responded, "A moment of glory is not eternal," which sparked controversy. After the remark, his career declined in the rest of 1980s. He was reported to have lived with his mother in Kam Tin since. In 2000s and thereafter, Choi made several comebacks in concerts and broadcast varieties.

Discography 
 What You Know ( dim yeung kong nei tsi, 1980)
 Young Trio ( ching cheon san chung jau, 1981)
 IQ sing sook si (1981)
 The Origin of Man ( yan ji chor, 1982)
 Ken Choi's New and Greatest Songs ( Choi Fung-Wah san kouk ching suen, 1983)
 Ken Choi (1983)
 Heat Wave ( gou wan king gaai, 1984)
 Love Is Not a Game ( ngoi bat see yau hei, 1985)
 Absolute Emptiness ( joot deoi hung heoi, 1986)
 Broken ( por seoi, 1986)
 In the Herd of Wind ( fung jung jeoi fung, 1987)
 Revolt and Other Selections ( boon yik + ching suen, 1988)
 Kenneth Today (1989)

Filmography 

Films
 Eclipse (1982; also called )
 The Odd One Dies (1997)

Television
 The Trio (1981), RTV, now called ATV
 Sweet Love Encore ( Encore, 1982), TVB
 The Pitfall (1985), TVB

References 

Living people
1960 births
Hong Kong male singers
University of Macau alumni